Ben Zakai is a religious moshav in central Israel. Located in the Shephelah, it falls under the jurisdiction of Hevel Yavne Regional Council.

History
The moshav was established in 1950 by Jewish refugees from Tripoli (in modern Libya) on the lands of depopulated Arab village of Yibna, and was named after Yochanan ben Zakai.

References

Moshavim
Religious Israeli communities
Populated places established in 1950
Populated places in Central District (Israel)
1950 establishments in Israel
Libyan-Jewish culture in Israel